Syurbayevo (Sirbay) is a rural locality (a village) in Arslanovsky Selsoviet, Kiginsky District, Bashkortostan, Russia. The population was 217 as of 2010. There are 4 streets.

Geography 
Syurbayevo is located 47 km east of Verkhniye Kigi (the district's administrative centre) by road. Abdrezyakovo is the nearest rural locality.

References 

Rural localities in Kiginsky District